Ruth Cardello is an American author of contemporary romance. She is a New York Times and USA Today bestselling author of over thirty titles.

Biography

Cardello was the youngest of eleven children born to Joseph and Francois Labrecque in Woonsocket, RI. She has worked as Kindergarten and English as a Second Language teacher for 20 years before becoming a full-time writer. She currently resides in Massachusetts with her husband and three children.

Bibliography

The Legacy Collection

The Lone Star Burn Collection

The Barrington Billionaires Collection

References

External links
 

Living people
21st-century American novelists
American romantic fiction writers
American women novelists
21st-century American women writers
People from Woonsocket, Rhode Island
Year of birth missing (living people)
Novelists from Rhode Island